Martyn Peter Holland (born 21 March 1977) is an English former professional rugby league footballer who played in the 1990s and 2000s.

Background
Martyn Holland was born in Barnsley, South Yorkshire, England.

First Division Grand Final appearances
Martyn Holland played , in Wakefield Trinity's 24-22 victory over Featherstone Rovers in the 1998 First Division Grand Final at McAlpine Stadium, Huddersfield on Saturday 26 September 1998.

References

1977 births
Living people
English rugby league players
Rugby league players from Wakefield
Rugby league fullbacks
Wakefield Trinity players